Denis Warburton Begbie (12 December 1914 – 10 March 2009) was a South African cricketer who played in five Tests from 1948 to 1950. He was born in Middelburg, Transvaal. At the time of his death he was the third oldest Test cricketer still living after New Zealand's Eric Tindill and fellow South African Norman Gordon.

Test career
Begbie made his Test debut against England in December 1948 at the age of 34, playing the first three Tests of the five-match series. In the first Test he scored 37 and 48, falling both times to Alec Bedser, as England won by 2 wickets. In the second Test he was out for 5 as the match was drawn. In the third Test, he was run out for 18 as the match was again drawn. Begbie did not play the final two games of the series, which was won 2–0 by England.

He next played for South Africa in the fourth Test of the 1949–50 series against Australia. He was out for 24 to Keith Miller as the match was drawn. In the final Test of the series, he was out for 1 to Geff Noblet in the first innings and then to Bill Johnston for 5 in the second and took his only Test wicket, bowling Neil Harvey for 116. Australia crushed South Africa by an innings and 259 runs to seal a 4–0 series victory. This was Begbie's final Test match.

References

1914 births
2009 deaths
South Africa Test cricketers
South African cricketers
Gauteng cricketers